Male Mahadeshwara Betta (Kannada: ಮಲೆ ಮಹದೇಶ್ವರ (also ಮಾದೇಶ್ವರ))is a pilgrim town located in the Hanur taluk of Chamarajanagar district of southern Karnataka. It is situated at about 150 km from Mysuru and about 210 km from Bengaluru. The ancient and sacred temple of Sri Male Mahadeshwara is a pilgrim centre where Mahadeshwara lived, practiced medicine as Sidda, taught ahimsa to people in and around the seven hills. It draws lakhs of pilgrims from the states of Karnataka and Tamil Nadu. In addition, the temple has lands at Talabetta, Haleyuru and Indiganatha villages. Amidst dense forest, the temple attracts not only the pilgrims but also nature lovers. The height of the hill is about 3000 feet above sea level.

The Lord Sri Mahadeshwara is believed to be the incarnation of Lord Shiva. Historical evidences suggest that the Saint Mahadeshwara must have lived during the 15th century. About 600 years ago, he came here to perform penance and it is believed that he is still performing penance in the temple's Garbha Gudi in the form of a Linga. The Linga, worshipped now in the Garbha Gudi, is a self-manifested (swayambhu) one. Sri Male Mahadeshwara Swamy was moving on a tiger known as Huli Vahana (Tiger as a vehicle) and performed a number of miracles around the Betta to save the people and saints living there. The Lord Sri Mahadeshwara's miracles are sometimes sung by the village folk in Janapada Style.

The story of Mahadeshwara 
According to legend, Male Mahadeshwara was born in Kali Yuga to a fair-skinned woman known as Uttarajamma and Chandrashekhara Murthy of Adi Jambava community.

He was spiritually guided by the then pontiff of Suttur Mutt and Kunthur Mutt (Veerashaiva Lingayat Mutts). The young saint is supposed to have come from Srishaila to this part of the state. He is said to have performed several miracles in his life, in these places. Afterwards he is said to have gone to the hills of Male Mahadeshwara. It is a dense forest area surrounded by seventy seven peaks in seven circles. It was not a safe place for human habitation. It was about six centuries ago that the young saint went in to the forest area, to save the saints who were performing penance and were taken captive by an evil king known as Shravana who possessed abundant black magic power. Apart from this there were tribes living here and there in small groups who were devoid of any rays of human civilization. It is said that Sri Mahadeshwara destroyed the black magic power of Shravana and released the saints who were in his prison. The place where they were kept captive is also a holy place, called Thavasere and the place where Shravana lived is called Shravana Boli.

According to tradition there are seven peaks identified in the legend - Anumale, Jenumale, Kanumale, Pachchemale, Pavalamale, Ponnachimale and Kongumale. These seven peaks together form the Male Mahadeshwara Betta. It is said that the saint Lord Mahadeshwara established a Mutt here for looking after the religious and cultural affairs of the people of this area. It is also said that, through his miracles, he enlightened and uplifted the hill tribes and made them his disciples. The people coming from these families have become hereditary 'Archakas' of the Mahadeshwara temple. The temple was under the control & management of Sri Salur Mutt established by the Lord Mahadeshwara himself until it was handed over to the Madras Government in the year 1953. After the formation of the state of Karnataka, the administration of the Temples is done by the trust committee, appointed by the Karnataka Government under the Muzrai Department.

Tourism 

Male Mahadeshwara Hills have become a tourist destination of Chamarajanagar district.  The hilltop is well-developed with paved roads and tiled footpaths.  There are villas that visitors can rent out during their stay.  There are many shops selling curios and pooja items.

About 50 years ago there were no roads to this place. People used to reach the place by walking. At present, there are road connections from Karnataka and Tamil Nadu. More than 100 buses ply this route every day.

There are several places of historical interest in this area to which the devotees often pay their visits. A pilgrimage to Male Mahadeshwara temple also includes a holy dip in the Antaragange (literally "a stream flowing from a perennial source").

Kamsale 

The song and dance routine is called Kamsale. Kamsale is closely connected with a tradition of Shiva worship.  Only those who have vowed to live a life of devotion to Mahadeshwara are supposed to perform kamsale. The dance is a part of a 'deeksha' or oath and is taught by a teacher or spiritual leader. Kamsale artists are illiterates and have no printed literature. They learn those songs orally. They participate in fairs, which are held in Mahadeshwara Betta during 'Deepavali', 'Shivaratri' and 'Ugadi' festivals. Hence, Mahadeshwara is also known as Badawara devaru Madappa
"Chellidaru Malligeya" is a famous folk song that describes the devotion and worship of lord Mahadeshwara.

Epic 

The epic story of Mahadeshwara describes the life and miracles of the saint. The outer structure of the epic resembles the pan-Indian Ramayana : Shiva incarnates himself on earth as Mahadeshwara to destroy an evil king called Shravanasura ('The Hero as Saviour' motif). The epic has seven parts; and normally, only certain parts are sung as dictated by the taste of the audience or patron. However, the entire epic is sung by some pilgrims on their way to the annual fair on the Mahadeshwara Betta; and it may last for seven consecutive nights.

The epic (single-narrator version) has seven parts. After traditional invocation, the first part narrates the immaculate birth, childhood, and spiritual quest of Mahadeshwara. The second part narrates the ways through which Mahadeshwara gets a wealthy kuruba Gowda Junje Gowda as his devotee to build him a temple on the Seven Betta. The next part is devoted to the destruction of the evil king, Shravanasura. Next we have the longest and most moving episode called 'Sankamma kathe'. This episode dramatises the suffering of a proud woman called 'Sankamma,' and the ordeals that she successfully undergoes in order to retain her dignity as a virtuous wife. The fifth episode, slightly comic in tone, depicts the rise and fall of a vainglorious and miserly woman, called 'Bevinatti Kalamma.' The last but one episode narrates how Mahadeshwara gets two simple and god-fearing people, Moogayya and his wife, as his devotee religion family. Mugayya family the grandson mahadeshwara. The concluding part, besides traditional ending with benediction, gives a brief summary of the entire epic.

Forest wealth 

Apart from being a pilgrimage centre, M.M.Hills possess large tracts of forest area. The landscapes of Betta and valleys are covered with forests. These forest types vary from evergreen forests in Ponnachi Boli to dry deciduous forests in most other parts. M.M.Betta is bound by the river Kaveri to the north-east and by the river Palar to the south.

The forests of M.M.Betta have been famous for wonderful regeneration and stock of sandalwood and bamboo. The forests are inhabited by a variety of animals, birds and reptiles. They are found in large numbers too. Elephants are the most prominent species. The latest estimate puts the population of elephants are more than 2500 in the district, which includes Bandipur National Park too. Frequent sightings of guars (Indian bison), sambars, spotted deer, jackals, sloth bears, porcupine, etc., apart from rare sightings of tigers, leopards and wild dogs are possible in and around this area. The Male Mahadeshwara Reserve Forests, has an approximate area of 39361.45 hectares and has a few small villages like Ponnachi, Kombadikki, Kokkebore, Doddane, Tokere, Tulsikere,Puduru village, Thambadi street or Thambadigere, Palar, Gopinatham, Indiganatham, etc., as enclosures within the reserve forests.

The then chief minister Jagadish Shettar, who presided over the meeting, approved this under Section 26A (I) (B) of the Wildlife Conservation Act, 1972, (Amendment 2006) on 7 May 2013. But the same information is yet to reflect on the website of the Karnataka Forest Department.

References

External links 
 

Hills of Karnataka
Mountains of the Western Ghats
Tourist attractions in Chamarajanagar district
Geography of Chamarajanagar district
South Deccan Plateau dry deciduous forests